Lerik may refer to:

 Lerik (rayon)
 Lerik, Azerbaijan